The list of historic reserves in Ukraine includes historic sites that in Ukraine are known as Historic and Cultural Reserves. Main historic reserves are officially listed by the Ministry of Culture of Ukraine and usually known as national. However, there are other historic reserves that are established at regional level.

Definition and background
Historic and cultural reserves are special legally defined territories that include ensembles and complexes of landmarks of history and culture, which possess exceptional historic, scientific and cultural value and placed under protection of the state.

In Ukraine
First historic and cultural reserves in Ukraine were created in 1920s. Resolutions of the Council of People's Commissars of the Ukrainian SSR proclaimed next territories as reserves: Ancient Greek Colony of Olbia (31 May 1924), the Monk's Hill in Kaniv – Taras Shevchenko burial (20 August 1925), Kyiv Pechersk Lavra (29 September 1926), Monastery of Barefoot Carmelites in Berdychiv (8 March 1928), Castle-Fortress in Kamianets-Podilskyi (23 March 1928), Prince Ostrogski Castle in Starokostiantyniv (15 January 1929), so called Dytynets in Chernihiv, territories of Chernihiv Saint Trinity Elijah Monastery and Chernihiv Yelets Dormition Monastery (18 March 1929) as well as Novhorod-Siverskyi Saint Transfiguration Monastery and Saint Cyril Church in Kyiv. In total at the end of 1920s in the Ukrainian SSR existed 9 historic and cultural reserves. At that time there was started creation of reserves of local significance. Particularly according to respective decisions of local authorities there existed historic and archaeological reserve in Verkhniy Saltiv (1929; Vovchansk Raion), manor house and park "Kachanivka" (1928), others.

During 1930s due to mass repressions among specialists of cultural heritage conservation and fall of the cultural heritage conservation system, many reserved territories lost their reserved status. After the World War II, portion of earlier created reserves that during the war suffered damage were not renewed in its reserved status. There were created new reserves, particularly the Kyiv Acropolis with remnants of Church of the Tithes (1945), museum-reserve "Fields of Battle for Kyiv" (1945), "Fields of Battle of Poltava" (1949), Ivan Tobilevych museum-reserve "Khutir Nadia" (1956). In 1965 there was announced creation of historic and cultural reserve at Khortytsia island in Zaporizhia, however due to unleashed ideological campaign in fight against the so called Ukrainian bourgeoisie nationalism all respective events were stopped.

In the mid 1970-80s process of creation of historic and cultural reserves started to be reviewed as an effective way to preserve not only separate landmarks, but whole historic and cultural complexes. The status of reserves was expanded to streets, neighborhoods, districts, historic city centers, historic landscapes. There were proclaimed historic and cultural reserves in cities of Lviv (1975), Kamianets-Podilskyi (1977), Sevastopol (1978), Ostroh (1981), Lutsk (1985), Putyvl (1986), Ancient Kyiv (1987), Kerch (1987), Chyhyryn (1989), and others.

With proclamation of state independence of Ukraine, the process of establishing historic and cultural reserves had awakened. Particularly in the first half of 1990s there was initiated or reorganized 32 state reserves by providing them with more status weight. Among them were Historic and Cultural Reserve "Taras Shevchenko Homeland", "Berestechko Battle Fields", "Hetmanate Capital", "Trakhtemyriv" as well as historic and architectural and archaeological complexes in cities of Alupka, Bakhchysarai, Vyshhorod, Halych, Hlukhiv, Dubno, Zhovkva, Zbarazh, Zolochiv, Kamianets-Podilskyi, Novhorod-Siverskyi, village Verkhniy Saltiv, others.

The Presidential decree of 11 October 1994 "About National Institutions of Culture" defined status and order of creation national historic and cultural reserves. First national reserves became, particularly, historic and ethnographic reserve "Pereyaslav", historic and archaeological reserve "Chersonesos of Taurica", historic and architectural reserves "Sophia of Kyiv", "National Kyiv Pechersk Historic and Cultural Reserve", "Chernihiv the Ancient", "Old Halych", "Chyhyryn", "Khortytsia".

Listed reserves (Ministry of Culture)

Listed reserves (National Academy of Sciences of Ukraine)

Reserves of Regional State Administration

See also

 List of places named after people (Ukraine)
 List of UNESCO World Heritage Sites in Ukraine
 Protected areas of Ukraine
 State Register of Immovable Landmarks of Ukraine
 Ukrainian historical regions

Further reading
 Legislation about monuments of history and culture: Collection of normative acts. (Законодавство про пам'ятники історії та культури: Збірник нормативних актів). Kiev, 1970
 Akulenko, V. Protection of cultural landmarks in Ukraine (1917-1990) (Охорона пам'яток культури в Україні (1917–1990)). Kiev, 1991
 Historic-Cultural Heritage of Ukraine: issues of research and preservation. (Історико-культурна спадщина України: проблеми дослідження та збереження). Kiev, 1998
 Vecherskyi, V. Architectural and urban planning heritage of Ukrainian regions. "Archaeological science (archaeometry) and protection of historic and cultural heritage" (Архітектурно-містобудівна спадщина регіонів України. "Археометрія та охорона історико-культурної спадщини"). Kiev, 1999. № 3.

References

External links
 Kot, S. Historic and Cultural Reserve. Encyclopedia of History of Ukraine.
 Historic reserves listed by the Ministry of Culture
 Site of the Scientific-Research Institute of Monument Preservation Research
 Website of the National Museum-Reserve "Battle of Kiev 1943"
 Kerch Historic-Cultural Sanctuary website
 Bakhchysarai Preserve

reserves
Historic reserves
Reserves
Historic reserves
Ukraine